Aipe is a town and municipality in the Huila Department, Colombia. Aipe borders Natagaima, Ataco and Planadas of the department of Tolima in the north and west, Villavieja and Tello in the east, and the departmental capital Neiva in the south.

History 
In early 1741, Doña Teresa and Don Enríque Cortés, descendants of Mr. Jacinto Cortés, gave 80 hectares to establish a new town, and are considered the founders of the Aipe. In 1770, the church hierarchy and government in Neiva records the construction of the church of Our Lady of Sorrows.

In 1874, Aipe acquired autonomy from Neiva, as a member of the canton district of Villavieja and on 8 April 1912 by Ordinance No. 26, was created as a municipality by the Departmental Assembly.

Geography 
The municipality of Aipe is located on the left bank of the Magdalena River. It is located in the northwest of the Department of Huila, in the Magdalena Valley, bounded on the north and west by the Department of Tolima, to the east the Magdalena River, and south by the capital of Huila; Neiva.

The municipality has a total area of 801.04 km2 (3.8% total of the department).

Paleontology 
In the Loma Gorda and Hondita Formations in Aipe, many Late Cretaceous (Cenomanian to Coniacian) species of ammonites have been found. The species Acanthoceras sp., Rhynchostreon sp., Choffaticeras sp., Fagesia catinus, Neoptychites cf. andinus, Mitonia gracilis, Morrowites sp., Nannovascoceras sp., Quitmaniceras sp., Benueites sp., Mytiloides kossmati, M. goppelnensis, Anomia sp., Paramammites sp., Hoplitoides sp., H. ingens, H. lagiraldae, Codazziceras ospinae, Allocrioceras sp., Prionocycloceras sp., P. guayabanum, Reesidites subtuberculatum, Subprionotropis colombianus, Mytiloides scupini, Dydimotis sp., Gauthiericeras sp., Anagaudryceras sp., Eulophoceras jacobi, Paralenticeras sieversi, Hauericeras madagascarensis, Peroniceras subtricarinatum, Forresteria sp., Barroisiceras onilahyense and Ankinatsytes venezolanus have been registered in Aipe.

References

Bibliography 
 

Municipalities of Huila Department
Populated places on the Magdalena River
Populated places established in 1741
1741 establishments in the Spanish Empire